Trud, translated from Bulgarian, Russian and other Slavic languages as "Labour", may refer to:
Trud (Bulgarian newspaper)
Trud (Russian newspaper)
Trud (sports society), the republican Voluntary Sports Society of the Russian SFSR
Trud, Tver Oblast, a former urban-type settlement in Russia; since 2000—a rural settlement
Trud, Kemerovo Oblast, a village (selo) in Kemerovo Oblast, Russia
Trud, Plovdiv Province, a village in Plovdiv Province, Bulgaria
FC Trud Noginsk, former name of FC Znamya Noginsk
FC Trud Tula, former name of FC Arsenal Tula
FC Trud Voronezh, former name of FC Fakel Voronezh
TruD, TRNA pseudouridine13 synthase, an enzyme

See also
Thrud
Trud Stadium (disambiguation)